William T. Nelson (October 15, 1908 – September 11, 1994) was a rear admiral in the United States Navy.

Biography
Nelson was born in Fall River, Massachusetts on October 15, 1908. He authored a book entitled Fresh Water Submarines: The Manitowoc Story about the submarines built by the Manitowoc Shipbuilding Company in Manitowoc, Wisconsin. He died in Falls Church, Virginia on September 11, 1994.

Career
Nelson graduated from the United States Naval Academy in 1930. During World War II he commanded the USS R-7, USS Peto (SS-265), and USS Lamprey (SS-372). He retired in 1965.

References

People from Fall River, Massachusetts
United States Navy admirals
United States Navy personnel of World War II
United States Naval Academy alumni
1908 births
1994 deaths
Military personnel from Massachusetts